Henry "Ole Pete" Peterson (c. 1854 - 1934) is a heroic Tampanian folk legend from Port Tampa, Florida, in the United States. He is considered by some to be the "John Henry" of Florida.

Legend

Henry Peterson, known locally as "Ole Pete", was said to be either a roustabout, switchman or longshoreman employed by the Atlantic Coast Line Railroad in Port Tampa, Florida.

According to the legend, Ole Pete was the strongest man in all of Florida, with the power of a black bear and agility of a panther. He was known to crack coconuts with his bare hands for the children of Port Tampa, and for 50 cents he would engage a bull in a headbutt contest.

One story tells how Ole Pete was taking a break in a railcar repair shed, his head resting on the tracks. Suddenly a switch engine pushed two rail cars into the shed where Ole Pete was resting. The first rail car in the shed ran over Ole Pete, causing it to derail. When workers rushed to his aid they witnessed him lifting the rail car back onto the tracks, to their astonishment not only was Ole Pete unharmed, but he was still half asleep. When the workers asked if he was alright, Ole Pete simply said, "My head feels kinda funny."

Other powerful feats attached to Ole Pete include the use of a ship's anchor for a pickaxe and lifting a locomotive back on the rails. He is also reported to have uprooted a large tree, brought it home, and chopped it into four cords of firewood.

A Henry Peterson, 46 years old, black, male, appears on the 1910 United States Census for Hillsborough County, Florida. Sources cite that Peterson died in 1934.

References 

1854 births
1934 deaths
Legendary American people
Fictional characters from Tampa, Florida
Tall tales
Florida folklore